Sharvavarman (Brahmi script: 𑀰𑀭𑁆𑀯𑁆𑀯𑀯𑀭𑁆𑀫𑁆𑀫𑀸 , Gupta script:  Śa-rvva-va-rmmā, complete form: Śarvavarman Indra Bhattarika) was a ruler of the Maukhari dynasty of Kannauj. He ruled circa 560-575 CE and had the title of "Mahārājādhirāja", "King of Kings" i.e. "Emperor".

Shavavarman may have been the greatest of the Maukhari emperors, invading Magadha circa 575 CE and defeating the Later Guptas kings Damodaragupta and Mahasenagupta, which made him ruler of the entire Uttar Pradesh.

Asirgarh and Nalanda seals
Shavavarman was the son of Ishanavarman. He and the chronology of his family are rather well known, because of a copper seal he created: the Asirgarh seal. The seal reads:

Several other nearly identical seals of Sharvavarman were also discovered in Nalanda. The content of the seals is identical, but small variations indicate that they come from different molds.

Reign

Sharvarman was an important rival of the Late Guptas king Mahasenagupta (r. c. 562-601 CE) during the period 575-585 CE.

With the end of Hunnic power in India, new contacts were established between India and the Sasanian Empire. Intellectual games such as chess and backgammon demonstrated and celebrated the diplomatic relationship between Khosrow I and a "great king of India." The vizier of the Indian king invented chess as a cheerful, playful challenge to King Khosrow. It seems that the Indian ruler who sent the game of chess to Khosrow may have been Śarvavarman, between the beginning of Śarvavarman's reign in 560/565 and the end of Khosrow's reign in 579, When the game was sent to Iran it came with a letter which read: "As your name is the King of Kings, all your emperorship over us connotes that your wise men should be wiser than ours. Either you send us an explanation of this game of chess or send revenue and tribute us." Khosrow's grand vizier successfully solved the riddle and figured out how to play chess. In response the wise vizier created the game backgammon and sent it to the Indian court with the same message. The Indian king was not able to solve the riddle and was forced to pay tribute.

Sharvavarman was succeeded by his son Avantivarman, as indicated by the "Sohanag seal of Avantivarman".

References

Works

Modern works 
 

6th-century Indian monarchs